Katharine Hepburn (1907–2003) and Spencer Tracy (1900–1967) were a legendary cinematic couple, both on- and off-screen. They starred in nine films together, and had an affair—an open secret in Hollywood—that lasted 26 years, ending only with Tracy's death.

Allegedly when they first met, Hepburn said, "I fear I may be too tall for you, Mr. Tracy" or possibly "You know, Mr. Tracy, I'm afraid I'm a bit too tall for you." In one version, Tracy supposedly replied, "Don't worry, I'll cut you down to my size." In another, Joseph L. Mankiewicz reportedly said, "Don't worry, Kate, he'll cut you down to size."

They were initially cool to each other on their first production together, Woman of the Year, but that quickly dissipated, and within a week, they were calling each other Spence and Kate. Hepburn fell in love with Tracy, but as a Catholic, he would not divorce his wife Louise. (After Louise Tracy's death in 1983, Hepburn finally acknowledged their decades-long affair.) The normally fiercely independent Hepburn accommodated herself to Tracy, seeing him through his periodic alcoholic relapses.

Tracy died shortly after completing their last film together, Guess Who's Coming to Dinner.

Filmography

Biographies about the pair
 Tracy and Hepburn: an intimate memoir, by Garson Kanin
 An Affair to Remember, by Christopher Andersen

References

Hepburn and Tracy